A rocketship is a rocket-powered vehicle used to transport robotic spacecraft or humans between the Earth's surface and outer space.

Rocketship, Rocket Ship, or rocket ship may refer to:

Nautical ships
Landing Craft Tank (Rocket), military ships armed with rockets
RS RocketShip, a cargo ship of the United States

Missile ships
 Missile cruiser, military ships armed with missiles
 Missile boat, a missile armed combat boat
 Arsenal ship, a floating missile battery

Spacecraft
 Space vehicle, the combination of launch vehicle and spacecraft, sometimes called rocketships
 Spacecraft, a craft, vehicle, vessel or machine designed for spaceflight, sometimes called rocketships

Music
Rocketship (band), an indie band from Sacramento, California

Songs
Rocketship (song), a song by the American rock band Mötley Crüe
"Rocketship", a song by Shane Harper
"Rocket Ship", a song by Marty Stuart
"Rocket Ship", a song by Jimmy Gage
"Rocket Ship", a song by Tommy McCook with Baba Brooks Band, 1965
"Rocket Ship", a song by the Medallions, 1960
"Rocket Ship", a song by Future, 2019
"Rocketship", a song by Guster, 1997

Other uses
Rocket Ship, the original title of a 1936 feature film derived from the Flash Gordon serial

See also

 Spaceship (disambiguation)
 Starship (disambiguation)
 
 
 
 
 
 Rocket (disambiguation)
 Ship (disambiguation)